The Supreme Court is the highest civil and criminal court in Burundi. It has nine members, including the Court President, who are nominated by the Judicial Service Commission and appointed by the President of the Republic after the approval of the Senate. The court's president is referred to as the Chief Justice.

The composition of the Supreme Court was established as a Court of Cassation with the independence of Burundi in 1962. Its current form is regulated by the Law of 25 February 2005. It is composed of three chambers which are known collectively as the United Chambers  (chambres réunies): 
 Judicial Chamber (chambre judiciaire);
 Administrative Chamber (chambre administrative);
 Chamber of Cassation (chambre de cassation). 

The Judicial Chamber is sub-divided into two sections: a Section of First Instance (section du premier degré) and an Appellate Section (section d'appel). Attached is the National Department of Public Prosecutions.

The Supreme Court may sit together with the Constitutional Court constituting the High Court of Justice which has special powers, such as the ability to try an incumbent president or government ministers for treason.

List of chief justices
This list is incomplete:

André Masunzu (1963)
Alois Malorerwa (1964)
Joseph Bukera (1967–1974)
Gaétan Rugambara (1974–1976)
Vincent Ndikumasabo (1977)
Pasteur Nzinahora (1978–1987) [Juvénal Njinyari listed as President in 1981 docket]
Gérard Buyoya (1988–1989)
Thérence Sinunguruza (1990)
Timothée Bisumbagutira (1995)
Juvénal Njinyari (1995)
Salvator Seromba (1995–1998) [Adrien Nyankiye listed as President in 1996 docket]
Ladislas Ndayisenga (1998)
Timothée Bisumbagutira (1999)
Adrien Nyankiye (2000–2005)
Ancilla Ntakaburimvo (2006–2011)
Jean-Marie Ngendanzi (2011)
Emmanuel Jenje (2012–2014)
Sylvestre Mpawenayo (2015–2016)
François Nkezabahizi (2016–2019)
Emmanuel Gateretse  (October 28, 2019– )

See also
 Judiciary of Burundi
Constitutional Court of Burundi

References

External links
 http://www.iasaj.org/juridic/fiches/membre/burundi.htm

Law of Burundi
Burundi
1962 establishments in Burundi
Courts and tribunals established in 1962